Robert Osmar Morales Benítez (born 17 March 1999), also known as La Pantera, is a Paraguayan professional footballer who plays as a striker for Cerro Porteño.

Club career

Youth career
Robert Morales was trained in the academy of Olimpia; He was also known for being one of the most efficient scorers in the Paraguayan lower league championships.

References

External links

1999 births
Living people
Paraguayan footballers
Paraguay international footballers
Association football forwards
Cerro Porteño players
Paraguayan Primera División players
People from Concepción Department, Paraguay